The Western Australian emergency of March 1942 was a series of local responses that occurred in relation to activity in  northern Western Australia that gave Australian military forces serious concerns about the capacity of the Japanese to move down the Western Australian coast.

The air raids on Broome and other locations in March 1942 caused the Allies to reinforce the military forces located in Western Australia to defend the state.

The action was taken to defend against the possibility that a force of Japanese warships and planes would attempt to attack the cities of Fremantle and Perth. 

The speed and extent of Japanese expansion to this time was considered a major threat to the region.

Extensive preparations and actions throughout the state of Western Australia were conducted to avert attacks and to prepare the population against possible invasion.

Japanese propaganda was produced at the time to spread the idea of invasion or bombing of southern Australian cities. Authorities were attempting to allay fears a month before the Darwin bombings. 

The events surrounding the bombings and response by authorities in northern Australia were referred to as "Japanese Scare" tactics.

The work undertaken in Fremantle and Perth to prepare for an imminent invasion or attack was the most extensive in the history of Western Australia.  

The establishment of the Fremantle submarine base was a part of the defensive actions, and it remained active until the end of the war. 

The subsequent Western Australian emergency of March 1944 was in effect a repeat of the 1942 emergency.

References

Further reading
 

Military attacks against Australia
1942 in Australia
Western Australia during World War II
1940s in Perth, Western Australia